"Psi-man Heal My Child!" is a science fiction short story  by American writer Philip K. Dick, originally published in the November 1955 issue of the magazine Imaginative Tales.  It also has the alternate titles of "Psi-Man" and  "Outside Consultant", and appeared, among the others, in Dick's short story collections The Book of Philip K. Dick and Second Variety.

Plot summary
The story revolves around a group of "Talents", people with varying psychoactive powers in a post-apocalyptic setting.  The remaining survivors of humanity are hunkered down in isolated communities and can only leave with permission from their military leaders.  The main plot of the story is of a family who chooses to have a Talent heal their daughter of cancer instead of the harsh treatments of their local hospital.  A side plot involves one of the Talents, who has the power to traverse time, repeatedly attempting to change the present by returning to the past.

External links
Page at Internet Speculative Fiction Database

Short stories by Philip K. Dick
1955 short stories